McDermott Glacier is a glacier flowing west from the Royal Society Range, Antarctica, between Dot Cliff and Berry Spur. It was named by the Advisory Committee on Antarctic Names (1994) after United States Geological Survey cartographer Cathleen McDermott, a member of the satellite surveying team at South Pole Station, winter party 1993.

References

Glaciers of Victoria Land
Scott Coast